Myles Aloysius Ferricks (12 November 1875 – 21 August 1932) was an Australian politician.

Born in Maryborough, Queensland, he was educated there at Christian Brothers School before becoming a bush worker, teacher and journalist, and editor of the Bowen Independent.

In 1909, he was elected to the Legislative Assembly of Queensland as the Labor member for Bowen, serving until 1912. In 1913 he was elected to the Australian Senate as a Labor Senator for Queensland. He remained in the Senate until his defeat in 1919, taking effect in 1920. In 1920, he returned to the Queensland Legislative Assembly as the member for South Brisbane, serving until 1929.

Ferricks died in 1932. His funeral was held at St Stephen's Cathedral which proceeded to Nudgee Cemetery.

References

Australian Labor Party members of the Parliament of Australia
Members of the Australian Senate for Queensland
Members of the Australian Senate
1875 births
1932 deaths
People from Maryborough, Queensland
20th-century Australian politicians
Members of the Queensland Legislative Assembly
Australian Labor Party members of the Parliament of Queensland